Vincent Dowling (1929–2013) was an Irish actor and director. 

Vincent Dowling may also refer to:

 Vincent George Dowling (1785–1852), an English journalist
 Vincent James Dowling (1835–1903), Australian explorer and pastoralist